Olufunke (sometimes shortened as Funke) is a Yoruba given name. Notable people include:
Fatimat Olufunke Raji-Rasaki  Nigerian politician and former civil servant
Olufunke Iyabo Osibodu Nigerian banker 
Olufunke Oshonaike  Nigerian table tennis player
Suzanne Olufunke Soboyejo-Iroche  Nigerian banker
Funke Akindele Nigerian actress
Olufunke Baruwa Nigerian gender and development practitioner
Ibiwunmi Omotayo Olufunke Felicity Olaiya Nigerian singer.
Olufunke Fayoyin Nigerian movie director.

Yoruba given names
Yoruba-language surnames